Trainwreck Riders is an American  four piece alt-country band from San Francisco, California. The band's releases include Where The Neon Turns To Wood (2002),  Lonely Road Revival (2006), The Perch (2009), Ghost Yards (2012), and Trainwreck Riders (2019).

References 

American alternative country groups
American country rock groups
Musical quartets
Musical groups from San Francisco
Alive Naturalsound Records artists